Johan Arnt Wenaas (16 May 1941 – 28 July 2015) was a Norwegian priest.

He was born in Hægebostad, and took the cand.theol. degree at the MF Norwegian School of Theology in 1966. He was ordained as a priest in 1967, worked as a curate in Jeløy from 1968 to 1974, and priest at Lovisenberg Hospital from 1974 to 1980. He was superintendent and director of the Deaconess House (now: Lovisenberg Diaconal University College) from 1980 to 1992 and secretary-general of the Social Service of the Church of Norway from 1992 to 2008. He released multiple books. He died in July 2015 in Hvitsten.

References

1941 births
2015 deaths
People from Vest-Agder
MF Norwegian School of Theology, Religion and Society alumni
Norwegian priests
Norwegian non-fiction writers